Ceanothus pumilus is a species of shrub in the family Rhamnaceae known by the common names dwarf ceanothus and Siskiyou mat.

Range and Habitat
Ceanothus pumilus is native to the mountains of southern Oregon and northern California, where it grows in habitat such as coniferous forest and chaparral, usually on serpentine soils.

Description
Ceanothus pumilus is a low-lying shrub taking the form of a mat or tangled mound up to about 2.5 meters wide. The small evergreen leaves are oppositely arranged, each just over a centimeter in maximum length. The leaves are thick, firm and ribbed, flat or cupped, hairless and dark green on top and generally hairy and paler in color on the undersides. The leaf usually has a distinctive three- (sometimes two-) toothed tip. Branches and twigs mature to gray and are often reddish when young. The inflorescence is an umbel-like cluster of small flowers in shades of blue, lavender, or white. When newly opened, the flowers have a closed star-like shape with protruding yellow anthers. The fruit is a horned capsule about half a centimeter long.

References

External links

Jepson Manual Treatment
USDA Plants Profile
Photo gallery

pumilus
Flora of California
Flora of Oregon
Flora of the Klamath Mountains
Natural history of the California chaparral and woodlands
Plants described in 1893
Taxa named by Edward Lee Greene